Mereni is a commune in Covasna County, Transylvania, Romania composed of two villages:
Lutoasa / Csomortán
Mereni / Kézdialmás

Demographics

The commune has an absolute Székely Hungarian majority. According to the 2011 census, it has a population of 1,312, of which 98.78% or 1,296 are Hungarian.

References

Communes in Covasna County
Localities in Transylvania